The following is a list of notable Australian hip hop artists:

0-9
 1200 Techniques
 360

A
 A.B. Original
 A.Girl
 Allday
 A-Love
 Andrez Bergen
 Astronomy Class

B
 Baker Boy
 Bangs
 Barkaa
 Benjamin Speed
 Bias B
 Big Dave
 Birdz
 Blades
 Bliss n Eso
 Brad Strut
 Brethren
 Briggs
 Brothablack
 Brothers Stoney
 Butterfingers

C
 Carmouflage Rose
 Chance Waters
 Chillinit
 Citizen Kay
 Combat Wombat
 Cristian Alexanda
 Curse ov Dialect

D
 Dazastah
 Def Wish Cast
 Diafrix
 Dialectrix
 DJ Bonez
 DJ Damage
 Downsyde
 Drapht

E
 Elf Tranzporter
 Em Flach
 Esoterik

F
 Figgkidd
 Fluent Form
 Foreign Heights
 Funkoars

G
 Giulietta
 Grey Ghost
 Gully Platoon

H
 Hau Latukefu
 Hermitude
 Hilltop Hoods
 Hunter
 Hyjak N Torcha
 Horrorshow

I
 Iggy Azalea
 Illy
 Illzilla
 Israel Cruz

J
 Jackson Jackson
 Justice & Kaos
 Joelistics
 J-Wess

K
 Katalyst
 Kat McSnatch
 Kenny Sabir
 Kerser
 Koolism
 Kwame

L
 L-FRESH the Lion
 The Last Kinection
 Lez Beckett
 Little G
 Local Knowledge

M
 Macromantics
 Manu Crooks
 Matty B
 Maya Jupiter
 MC Layla
 MC Opi
 MC Trey
 Metabass'n'Breath
 Mighty Big Crime
 Milwaukee Banks
 Mind over Matter
 Mista Savona
 Miracle
 Mnemonic Ascent
 Morganics
 M-Phazes
 Muph & Plutonic
 Munkimuk

N
 Native Ryme Syndicate
 N'fa

O
 Omar Musa

P
 Paul Nakad
 Pegz
 Pez
 Phinesse
 Phrase
 Purified

Q
 Quro

R
 Radical Son
 Raspberry Cordial
 Resin Dogs
 Ryland Rose

S
 Seth Sentry
 Snob Scrilla
 Sound Unlimited
 Space Invadas
 Spit Syndicate
 Stik n Move
 Street Warriors

T 
 Thundamentals
 Tkay Maidza
 The Bumblebeez
The Kid Laroi
 The Tongue
 The Herd
 The Wilcannia Mob
 The Meeting Tree
 Trials
 True Live
 Tuka
 TZU

U
 Urthboy

V
 Vents

Y
 Yung Warriors

See also

 Australian hip hop
 Music of Australia

References

Australian
hip hop musicians